Eloi is a given name and a surname, and may refer to:

Given name:
Saint Eligius or Éloi (588–660), Christian saint and bishop
Eloi Amagat (born 1985), Spanish footballer known simply as Eloi
Eloi Baribeau (1906-1957), Canadian businessman and politician
Éloi Guillemette (1911-1984), Canadian politician
Éloi Johanneau (1770–1851), French philologist
Eloi Metullus (1892-?), 1924 Olympic sport shooter for Haiti
Éloi Meulenberg (1912-1989), Belgian road bicycle racer
Éloi Pélissier (born 1991), French rugby league player
Elói Schleder (born 1951), Brazilian former long-distance runner
Elói Silva (born 1993), Portuguese football goalkeeper
Eloi Tassin (1912-1977), French road bicycle racer
Eloi Charlemagne Taupin (1767-1814), French general in the Napoleonic Wars

Surname:
Armand Eloi (born 1962), Belgian actor and director
Damien Éloi (born 1969), French table tennis player
Wagneau Eloi (born 1973), Haitian former footballer

See also
Eloy (given name)
Eloy (surname)
Elois, two people with the given name

Masculine given names